In accordance with the law, citizens of all countries except the Schengen Area and Taiwan are required to have a visa to visit Tuvalu. Visas are obtained on arrival and are issued for a maximum stay of 1 month. All visitors must hold a passport valid for 6 months.

Visa policy map

Visa-free access
Citizens of member nations of the Schengen Area and  may visit Tuvalu without visa limits. Schengen Area citizens are granted visa free for a maximum stay of 90 days within any 180 day period, while citizens of Taiwan are granted visa free entry for 90 days.

Visa fee waiver
Visitors from the following countries and territories are not required to pay a visa fee ($100 Australian Dollars). They get a visa on arrival:

See also

Visa requirements for Tuvaluan citizens

References

Tuvalu
Foreign relations of Tuvalu
Law of Tuvalu